The Shuckburgh Arms is a Grade II listed public house on the corner of Denyer Street and Milner Street, Chelsea, London.

It was built in the mid-19th century, but the architect is not known. English Heritage have noted its "unspoilt condition".

The Shuckburgh Arms closed after several drug raids and has since become a branch of the "Baker & Spice" delicatessen chain.

References

Pubs in the Royal Borough of Kensington and Chelsea
Grade II listed pubs in London
Chelsea, London
Buildings and structures completed in the 19th century
19th-century architecture in the United Kingdom